Roosa, could refer to:

People 
 Roosa Timonen, Finnish tennis player
 Daniel Bennett St. John Roosa, American physician
 Robert Roosa, American economist and banker
 Stuart Roosa,  NASA astronaut

Places 
 Rõõsa, a village in Kose Parish, Harju County in northern Estonia
 Röösa, a village in Valjala Commune in Saare County in western Estonia
 Vana-Roosa (locally known as Roosa), a settlement in Varstu Parish, Võru County in southeastern Estonia 
 Vastse-Roosa, a village in Mõniste Parish, Võru County in southeastern Estonia

Fictional characters 
 General Manie Roosa, a character in James Rollins and Grant Blackwood's novel The Kill Switch (2014), who their epilogue states is "very loosely based on the real-life Boer leader Manie Maritz"